The Institute of Asian Research (IAR) at the University of British Columbia is a research institute founded in 1978 and has been the foremost research centre in Canada for the inter-disciplinary study of Asia. With a broad geographic reach extending to China, India and South Asia, Japan, Korea and Southeast Asia, the institute conducts research and teaching in policy-relevant issues informed by language and area studies. 

The institute's Master of Public Policy and Global Affairs program is a professional global public policy program with particular expertise in the Asia-Pacific region and sustainability policies. The program provides policy makers and future leaders with multidisciplinary policy analysis and design skills and subject-specific expertise in development, sustainability, and global governance.

Institute of Asian Research Faculty 
 Timothy Brook, Republic of China, chair in Chinese Research
 Timothy Cheek, Louis Cha Chair in Chinese Research
 Cesi Cruz, assistant professor, Institute of Asian Research and department of political science
 Julian Dierkes, assistant professor and Keidanren Chair in Japanese Research
 Paul M. Evans, director of the Institute of Asian Research
 Hyung Gu Lynn, AECL/KEPCO Chair in Korean Research
 Jessica Main, Tung Lin Kok Yuen Canada Foundation Chair in Buddhism and Contemporary Society
 Kai Ostwald, assistant professor, Institute of Asian Research and department of political science
 Kyung-Ae Park, Korea Foundation Chair in Korean Research
 Pitman B. Potter, Hong Kong Bank Chair in Asian Research
 Tsering Shakya, CRC Chair in Religion and Contemporary Society of Asia
 Sara Shneiderman, assistant professor, Institute of Asian Research and department of anthropology
 Yves Tiberghien, associate professor, Department of Political Science; Senior Fellow, Global Summitry Project, Munk School of Global Affairs; Senior Fellow, Asia-Pacific Foundation of Canada (APFC); co-director, UBC China Council
 Ilan Vertinsky, Vinod Sood Professor, International Business Studies, Sauder School of Business, professor of Strategy and Business Economics, professor, Institute of Asian Research and Sauder School of Business

Master of Public Policy and Global Affairs Program  
UBC's Master of Public Policy and Global Affairs is a graduate program that provides a path for management roles in international institutions, corporations, non-governmental organizations and various levels of government in all parts of the world.

C. K. Choi Building 

The institute is housed in the purpose-built C. K. Choi Building in the northwest quadrant of the UBC campus.  Designed by Matsuzaki Wright Architects of Vancouver, B.C., and completed in 1995, the building has been recognized for its sustainable design.  It is the University of British Columbia's "flagship environmental building" in what is calls its ‘living laboratory’, the campus used to showcase "innovative approaches to conserving energy, water and materials, while striving to make positive impacts on the environment."

The building is named after Dr. Cheung-Kok Choi, a businessman and philanthropist in China, Hong Kong and Canada, and a major donor to UBC.
The building houses the institute's five research centres which focus on China, Japan, Korea, Southeast Asia, and India and South Asia.  The "daringly innovative architecture" integrates cultural expression, interior and exterior architectural presence, together with environmental features and functions.  The five identical curved roof forms reflect the institute's Asian focus, providing an identifiable focus for each research centre without giving predominance to one culture or centre over another, and provide natural light and natural ventilation to interior spaces.

References

1978 establishments in British Columbia
Research institutes of international relations
Public policy schools
University of British Columbia
Research institutes in Canada
Sustainable architecture
Buildings and structures in Vancouver